Zaplanina is a dispersed settlement in the Municipality of Vransko in central Slovenia. It lies in the hills south of Vransko. The area is part of the traditional region of Styria. The Municipality of Vransko is now included in the Savinja Statistical Region. The settlement includes the hamlets of Zgornja Zaplanina (in older sources also Gornja Zaplanina), Spodnja Zaplanina, and Podles.

References

External links
Zaplanina at Geopedia

Populated places in the Municipality of Vransko